Ptinomorphus is a genus of beetles belonging to the family Ptinidae.

The species of this genus are found in Europe, Japan and Northern America.

Species:
 Ptinomorphus angustatus (C.Brisout de Barneville, 1862) 
 Ptinomorphus imperialis (Linnaeus, 1767)

References

Ptinidae